Roger Federer was the defending champion, but lost in the first round to Andy Murray.

Sixth-seeded Andy Roddick won in the final 6–7(8–10), 6–4, 6–2, against Feliciano López.

Seeds

Draw

Finals

Top half

Bottom half

External links
 Draw
 Qualifying draw

2008 Dubai Tennis Championships
Dubai Tennis Championships